Henry Keene (15 November 1726 – 8 January 1776) was an English architect, notable for designing buildings in the Gothic Revival and Neoclassical style.

Life and work 
Keene was born in the London area, and at the age of 20 became Surveyor to the Dean and Chapter of Westminster.  Six years later, he was appointed Surveyor of the Fabric of Westminster Abbey.  He worked in Ireland at various times between 1752 and 1766, but nearly all his known surviving buildings are in England, especially in London and Oxford, where he had houses, and on various country estates.  While much of his work is in the neo-classical style, he was an early exponent of Strawberry Hill Gothic, making good use of his knowledge of the Gothic details of Westminster Abbey. He had a son, Theodosius Keene, who was also an architect and known for designing Racton Monument.

He died at his country house at Drayton Green near Ealing.

Selected buildings still standing 

Hartlebury Castle, Worcestershire — refitted the Chapel in the Gothic style, c. 1750
Trinity College, Dublin — jointly responsible with John Sanderson for the west front on College Green, 1752–59
Hartwell, Buckinghamshire — built the church (now in ruins) in Gothic style, 1753–55
High Wycombe, Bucks. — Gothicised the church, 1754;  built the Guildhall, 1757
Bowood House, Wiltshire — stables, 1754
Hartwell House, Bucks. — rebuilt the east front, etc., 1759–61
Arbury Hall, Warwickshire — designs for Gothicising commissioned by Sir Roger Newdigate, 1762
Radcliffe Observatory, Oxford — begun, 1772–76 (completed by Keene's son Theodosius, under the direction of James Wyatt, 1794)
Worcester College, Oxford — Provost's Lodgings and completion of George Clarke's Terrace, 1773–76
Vandalian Tower, Harting — folly, 1774

Bibliography 
H.M. Colvin:  Biographical Dictionary of English Architects 1660-1840 (London, John Murray, 1954)

British neoclassical architects
1726 births
1776 deaths
Architects from London
18th-century English architects